Sidney Davidoff (born July 18, 1939) is an American lawyer who was one of 20 people on Nixon's Enemies List.

Life and career
Born in Brooklyn, New York, Davidoff graduated with a bachelor's degree from City College of New York in 1960 and earned his J.D. from New York University in 1963. He was admitted to the New York Bar that year.

Davidoff was administrative assistant to New York Mayor John Lindsay for seven years. Hendrik Hertzberg called him "the Mayor's burly troubleshooter".

He served as President of The New York Young Republican Club from 1967 to 1968.

In 1968, when students took over Hamilton Hall at Columbia University and held dean Henry S. Coleman captive, Lindsay sent Davidoff as one of the mediators to broker the dean's release. He likely caught the attention of Nixon staffers following a street fracas between pro- and anti-war demonstrators, where Davidoff re-lowered the American flag to half-mast in honor of the four demonstrators killed at the Kent State shootings after opponents had raised it in defiance.

On Nixon's list, Davidoff was described thus: "Lindsay's top personal aide: a first class S.O.B., wheeler-dealer and suspected bagman. Positive results would really shake the Lindsay camp and Lindsay's plans to capture youth vote. Davidoff in charge."

Davidoff was a Chubb Fellow at Yale University, as well as a lecturer to the Root-Tilden students at New York University School of Law. Davidoff is currently a senior partner in the firm Davidoff Hutcher & Citron LLP, which he founded in 1975. The firm is recognized as one of the top lobbyists in the state of New York. He later went on to form the New York Advocacy Association, a "lobbying group for lobbyists," designed to counter strict and complicated lobbying laws in the State of New York. He is a member of the Metropolitan New York Board of Governors for the United States Olympic Committee.

Davidoff has also had roles in television shows, including the ABC comedy Spin City, and The Sopranos.

References

External links
Profile at Davidoff & Citron Hutcher LLP

Nixon's Enemies List
1939 births
Living people
People from Brooklyn
New York (state) lawyers